Uganda is located in eastern Africa, west of Kenya, south of South Sudan, east of the Democratic Republic of the Congo, and north of Rwanda and Tanzania. While much of its border is lakeshore, Uganda is landlocked with no access to the sea but it is a fertile and well-watered country that consists of many lakes and rivers including the largest, Lake Victoria. As the country sits in the heart of the Great Lakes region, and is surrounded by three of them, Lake Edward and Lake Albert.

The climate is tropical and is generally rainy with two dry seasons (December to February, June to August). While the northeast of the country is semiarid. The terrain of Uganda mostly consist of plateaus surrounded by a rim of mountains including the Rwenzori mountain range. Notable national parks include Bwindi, Rwenzori Mountains, Kibale and Mgahinga National Park.

Inselbergs are common features in the geography of Uganda. The inselbergs are commonly made of granite, sometimes of gneiss and never of amphibolite or volcanic rock. Protruding quartzite hills tend to form ridges rather than "true inselbergs".

Statistics 

Area:
total: 
land: 
water: 

Land boundaries:
total: 
border countries: Democratic Republic of the Congo , Kenya , South Sudan , Tanzania , Rwanda 

Elevation extremes:
lowest point:  Albert Nile at border with South Sudan
highest point:  Margherita Peak on Mount Stanley

Natural resources:
copper, cobalt, hydropower, limestone, salt, arable land, gold

Land use: (2012) 
arable land:  34.41%
permanent crops:  11.22%
forest cover:  14.01%
other:  40.36%

Irrigated land: (2012)


Total renewable water resources:

Environment - current issues:
draining of wetlands for agricultural use, deforestation, overgrazing, soil erosion, water hyacinth infestation in Lake Victoria, widespread poaching

Environment - international agreements:
party to:
 Convention on the International Maritime Organization
 Convention Concerning the Protection of the World Cultural and Natural Heritage
 Agreement on the Conservation of African-Eurasian Migratory Waterbirds
 United Nations Framework Convention on Climate Change
 Vienna Convention for the Protection of the Ozone Layer
 Kyoto Protocol to the United Nations Framework Convention on Climate Change
 Convention on International Trade in Endangered Species of Wild Fauna and Flora
 Basel Convention on the Control of Transboundary Movements of Hazardous Wastes and Their Disposal
 United Nations Convention on the Law of the Sea
 Convention on Biological Diversity
 United Nations Convention to Combat Desertification in Those Countries Experiencing Serious Drought and/or Desertification, Particularly in Africa
 International Plant Protection Convention
 Convention on Wetlands of International Importance, especially as Waterfowl Habitat
signed, but not ratified:
 Convention on the Prohibition of Military or Any Other Hostile Use of Environmental Modification Techniques

Geography - note: Uganda is one of six African states that lies on the equator. Most part of Uganda is north of the equator.

Population geography 
Uganda's most populated cities are located in the Central and Eastern regions of the country.

Kampala is Uganda's most populated city, also its national and commercial capital. Its population is around 3,652,000 as of 2022 with an increase of 5.24% from 2021.

Climate 
Uganda has a warm tropical climate with temperatures falling in the 25–29°C (77–84°F) range on an average. The months from December to February are the hottest, but even during this season the evenings can be chilly with temperatures in the 17–18°C (63–64°F) range.

Uganda receives an annual rainfall of 1,000mm to 1,500mm. The rainy seasons are from March to May and from September to November. During these months, heavy rains can make roads and terrains hard to traverse. The period from January to February and again from June to August are dry.

Climate change

See also 

 List of Protected Areas in Uganda

References 

 

bn:উগান্ডা#ভূগোল